Proposition 56 is a California ballot proposition that passed on the November 8, 2016 ballot. It increased the cigarette tax by $2.00 per pack, effective April 1, 2017, with equivalent increases on other tobacco products and electronic cigarettes containing nicotine.  The bulk of new revenue is earmarked for Medi-Cal.

A September 2016 poll by the Public Policy Institute of California showed that 59% of likely voters supported Proposition 56, 36% opposed it, and 5% did not know how they would vote. A September 2016 poll from USC Dornsife / Los Angeles Times showed 63% percent of registered voters in favor of Proposition 56, 32% opposed, and 6% unknown.

Proposition 56 was approved with 64% of the vote.  Two previous attempts to increase the state cigarette tax narrowly failed with Proposition 86 in 2006 and Proposition 29 in 2012.  Proposition 56 was the first increase in the state cigarette tax since Proposition 10 in 1998.  With the passage of Prop. 56, California's cigarette tax increased from $0.87 per pack to $2.87, increasing its rank from 35th-highest in the country to ninth-highest.

See also 
 California Proposition 99 (1988)
 California Proposition 10 (1998)
 Cigarette taxes in the United States

References

External links 
 Yes on 56

2016 California ballot propositions
Taxation in California
Tobacco taxation
Tobacco control
Smoking in the United States